Oscar G. Chase is an American legal academic.

Chase earned a degree in English literature at New York University in 1960, and completed his legal studies at Yale Law School in 1963. Chase began his career in legal scholarship as a professor of law at Brooklyn Law School from 1972 to 1978, and began teaching at the New York University School of Law in 1980, where he was later named Russell D. Niles Professor of Law.

References

Yale Law School alumni
New York University alumni
New York University School of Law faculty
Brooklyn Law School faculty
New York (state) lawyers
20th-century American lawyers
Year of birth missing (living people)
Living people